The Balmoral South mine was a proposed large iron ore located in the Pilbara region of Western Australia. Balmoral South represents one of the largest iron ore reserves in Australia and the world, having estimated reserves of 859 million tonnes of ore grading 22.6% MagFe and 31.2% Fe.  It is currently owned by Clive Palmer's company Mineralogy.

The mine never went ahead and is the subject of a legal dispute between Palmer and the Government of Western Australia, the latter being sued for AUS$27.7 Billion. 
Later on, the WA Government attempted to pass legislation to shield itself from the damages claim.

References 

Iron ore mines in Western Australia
Pilbara
Proposed infrastructure in Australia
Infrastructure in Western Australia